"In Your Eyes" is a song by Australian singer Kylie Minogue, taken from her eighth studio album, Fever (2001). It was written by Minogue, Richard Stannard, Julian Gallagher, and Ash Howes and produced by Stannard and Gallagher. It is a dance-pop song and talks about sexual temptation. The song was released in Australia on 21 January 2002 as the second single from the album. In Europe, it was delayed from a January release due to the success of "Can't Get You Out of My Head", and it was eventually issued on 18 February 2002 by Parlophone.

Critical reception towards "In Your Eyes" was mostly positive, who commended the catchy chorus and the production, but many critics were reluctant in reviewing the song on the album. In Australia, the song debuted at number one was certified gold by the Australian Recording Industry Association (ARIA). It reached number three in the United Kingdom, and was certified silver by the British Phonographic Industry (BPI). The single also charted inside the top 20 in Finland, Hungary, Canada, and New Zealand.

A music video for "In Your Eyes" was directed by Dawn Shadforth and was envisioned as a science fiction-extension from Minogue's previous single, "Can't Get You Out of My Head" (2001). It features Minogue and numerous backup dancers, surrounded with LED lights. "In Your Eyes" was performed on her 2002 Fever Tour and has appeared on most of her concert tours since, including the one-off concert show Money Can't Buy and most recently in the Golden Tour in 2018.

Background and release

Following the success of Minogue's 2001 single, "Can't Get You Out of My Head", Minogue's label Parlophone were set to release the second single from the album Fever (2001). Minogue enlisted several writers and producers such as Richard Stannard, Julian Gallagher, and Ash Howes, all of whom worked with Minogue on her seventh album, Light Years (2000). All four of them, including Minogue, wrote "In Your Eyes" together, while Stannard and Gallagher handled the production of the song. After the major success of "Can't Get You Out of My Head", it was announced that "In Your Eyes" would be released as the album's second official single, set for a January 2002 release. However, due to the overwhelming success and radio airplay in Europe, the single was postponed there until February 2002.

Musically, "In Your Eyes" is a dance-pop song, which features influences of nu-disco and Europop. In the first verse, her vocals span and range from Fm-D-D-C-Bm. When it reaches the chorus, her vocals range from Fm-Bm-C. The chords basically repeat with each verse it has. According to Popmatters and NME, the described the song as "another disco-sounding club track that lyrically propels Minogue further into a more sexual sound on the lyrics "I want to make it with you." Ian Wade from Yahoo! Music compared it to Minogue's song "Spinning Around". He said "'In Your Eyes' which cheekily references comeback hit 'Spinning Around'."

Reception

Critical response

Sal Cinquemani from Slant Magazine called the song a "contagious club hit waiting to infect".

Chart performance
In Europe, "In Your Eyes" was released on 18 February 2002. It was originally scheduled for release in January but was delayed because of the airplay popularity of "Can't Get You Out of My Head". It debuted at number three on the UK Singles Chart, becoming her 22nd top-10 single. The song remained on the chart for 17 weeks, three of which were in the top 20. The single became a hit elsewhere in Europe, reaching the top five in the Czech Republic, Greece, Hungary, and Poland. "In Your Eyes" was released in Canada, where it peaked at number eleven, but not in the United States, where "Can't Get You Out of My Head" had just been released.

In Australia, "In Your Eyes" was released as scheduled on 21 January 2002. It debuted at number one on the ARIA singles chart and became the fourth single by Minogue to reach the top position since 2000. The ARIA certified the song gold for shipments of over 35,000 units. It peaked at number 18 on Recording Industry Association of New Zealand (RIANZ) and stayed on the charts for 18 weeks.

Music video

Background and synopsis
"In Your Eyes" featured a music video that was directed by Dawn Shadforth. The video features Minogue in a studio filled with colourful neon lights. There are two sequences; the first features Minogue and a group of dancers in front of a colourful background, the second is simply Minogue spinning before a background of flashing lights. Throughout the video, the two scenes are intercut and gradually fade.

The video featured an extension of the futuristic theme first introduced in the music video for "Can't Get You Out of My Head" the previous year. Minogue and her artistic director William Baker had become interested in the street interpretation of robotic, jerky movements and included this in the video. The costumes also represent this interest and were described by Baker as being a mix of "hip hop chic with sci-fi lunacy".

Reception
Released to music video channels prior to the single's commercial release, the video was a hit, charting at number one on MTV's Hit List UK and at number four on MTV Europe's top twenty countdown. The video was first released commercially as a DVD single in Australia in 2002 but was also included on the Ultimate Kylie companion DVD, released in December 2004.

Live performances and usage in media
The song was first performed on An Audience With Kylie Minogue; "In Your Eyes" was then included in the "Sex in Venice" section of KylieFever2002, where it was performed as a medley with a Latin version of itself, "Please Stay" and a chorus of "Rhythm of the Night" The song was next performed in 2003 at Minogue's one-off, invitation-only gig Money Can't Buy to promote her ninth studio album Body Language. It was featured in the third act "Electro". "In Your Eyes" was performed as the second song of the show in both the Showgirl and Homecoming tours and was remixed for inclusion on KylieX2008 and For You, For Me, where it was included in the first section of both shows; this version of the song was also included on the set list for Kylie Summer 2015. The song was performed on the Aphrodite Tour in 2011 where it was performed in Japan only and as a request at a lot of dates; it was included in the rehearsal set list, after "Can't Get You Out of My Head", but was ultimately discarded from the main show. In 2018, the song was reworked and included in Minogue's headlining set for Radio 2 Live in Hyde Park, which was later included in Minogue's Golden Tour. This version of the song was combined with the version from KylieX2008 and was performed on Minogue's Summer 2019 tour. More recently, a new club reworking of the song, handled by longtime collaborators Steve Anderson and Richard Stannard, was included as the second song in the Infinite Disco live stream, launched in promotion of Minogue's fifteenth studio album Disco (2020).

The song was used in the 2020 thriller movie The Hater, directed by Jan Komasa, in the gay club scene with Maciej Stuhr and Maciej Musiałowski.

Track listings

Australian CD1
 "In Your Eyes" - 3:18
 "Never Spoken" - 3:19
 "Harmony" - 4:16
 "In Your Eyes" (The S-Man's Release mix) - 7:32

Australian CD2
 "In Your Eyes" - 3:18
 "In Your Eyes" (Mr. Bishi mix) - 7:12
 "In Your Eyes" (Jean Jacques Smoothie dub) - 6:20
 "In Your Eyes" (Saeed & Palesh main mix) - 8:35

Australian limited-edition DVD single
 "In Your Eyes" (video)
 "Can't Get You Out of My Head" (video) 
 "In Your Eyes" (Roger Sanchez Release the Dub mix)
 "Can't Get You Out of My Head" (Nick Faber mix)

UK CD1
 "In Your Eyes" – 3:18
 "Tightrope" – 4:27
 "Good Like That" – 3:33

UK CD2
 "In Your Eyes" – 3:18
 "In Your Eyes" (The S-Man's Release mix) – 7:32
 "In Your Eyes" (Jean Jacques Smoothie mix) – 6:21

UK 12-inch single
A1. "In Your Eyes" (Saeed & Palesh main mix) – 8:34
B1. "In Your Eyes" (Powder's Spaced dub) – 7:25
B2. "In Your Eyes" (Roger Sanchez Release the Dub mix) – 7:15

European CD single and UK cassette single
 "In Your Eyes" – 3:18
 "Tightrope" – 4:27

Credits and personnel
Credits are taken from the Australian CD1 liner notes.
 Lead vocals – Kylie Minogue
 Background vocals – Richard Stannard
 Writing – Kylie Minogue, Richard Stannard, Julian Gallagher, Ash Howes
 Producing – Richard "Biff" Stannard, Julian Gallagher
 Recording and programming – Ash Howes, Alvin Sweeney, Martin Harrington
 Mixing – Ash Howes at Biffco Studios
 Keyboards – Julian Gallagher
 Guitar – Martin Harrington
 Drums – Mimi Tachikawa
 Bass – Steve Lewinson
 Photography – Vincent Peters

Charts

Weekly charts

Year-end charts

Certifications

See also
 List of number-one singles in Australia in 2002
 List of number-one dance singles of 2002 (Australia)
 List of Romanian Top 100 number ones of the 2000s

Cover versions
 Italian group Nossa Alma Canta covered the song in bossa nova style on the 2008 album I Was Made For Bossa.
 The song has been covered by Hong Kong singer Chet Lam, most notably during his live performances.
 The song was covered twice on a Polish version of Soapstar Superstar called Jak oni śpiewają by Agnieszka Włodarczyk and Laura Samojłowicz.

Notes

2001 songs
2002 singles
Festival Records singles
Kylie Minogue songs
Number-one singles in Australia
Number-one singles in Hungary
Number-one singles in Romania
Parlophone singles
Songs written by Julian Gallagher
Songs written by Ash Howes
Songs written by Kylie Minogue
Songs written by Richard Stannard (songwriter)
Techno songs